Charles Mopsik (2 September 1956 – 13 June 2003) was a French thinker, researcher and writer who renewed the study of the Cabbala and of Jewish mysticism.

Biography
He was one of the important figures in the revival of Jewish studies in France at the end of the 1970s, a revival characterized by its philosophical consequences. In 1979, he founded the book collection "Les dix paroles" (The ten words) published by Editions Verdier, with Maimonides's Guide des égarés (The Guide for the Perplexed) as the first emblematic volume, followed by a translation from the Aramaic of the Book of Genesis in the Zohar.

A student of Jean Zacklad (1929-1990), he was himself initiated into Cabbala by Rav Levi Saadia Nahmani. He specialized in the study of Jewish mystagogical and theurgic traditions which developed in Spain and Provence from the 12th century and 13th century. He defended his doctorate in philosophy at the University of Paris I in 1987, with his thesis Recherches autour de la Lettre sur la sainteté: Sources, texte, influences (Research into the Letter on Holiness: Sources, Text, Influences), under the direction of Pierre Thillet, a specialist in the Peripatetic tradition.

As a translator, an historian and a researcher, Charles Mopsik was a major figure in the study of the Cabbala.

He died at the age of 46 following a serious illness. An Association Charles Mopsik was created after his death with the aim of preserving his memory and promoting his work.

External links
 Association Charles Mopsik - website dedicated to C. Mopsik
 Charles Mopsik - obituary by Catherine Chalier

References 

1956 births
2003 deaths
French male writers
Kabbalah
French Jews
Jewish philosophers